The 1993 Purex Tennis Championships was an Association of Tennis Professionals men's tennis tournament held in Scottsdale, Arizona in the United States that was part of the World Series of the 1993 ATP Tour. It was the sixth edition of the tournament and was held from February 22 to February 28, 1993 Second-seeded Andre Agassi won the singles title and earned $39,600 first-prize money.

Finals

Singles

 Andre Agassi defeated  Marcos Ondruska 6–2, 3–6, 6–3
 It was Agassi's 2nd singles title of the year and the 19th of his career.

Doubles

 Mark Keil /  Dave Randall defeated  Luke Jensen /  Sandon Stolle 7–5, 6–4
 It was Keil's 1st title of the year and the 2nd of his career. It was Randall's only title of the year and the 2nd of his career.

References

External links 
 ITF tournament edition details

Purex Tennis Championships
 
Tennis Channel Open
Purex Tennis Championships
Purex Tennis Championships
Purex Tennis Championships